Gmina Sosnówka is a rural gmina (administrative district) in Biała Podlaska County, Lublin Voivodeship, in eastern Poland.

Villages
Gmina Sosnówka contains the villages and settlements of Czeputka, Dębów, Lipinki, Motwica, Omszana, Pogorzelec, Przechód, Romanów, Rozwadówka, Rozwadówka-Folwark, Sapiehów, Sosnówka, Wygnanka, Żeszczynka and Żuława.

Neighbouring gminas
Gmina Sosnówka is bordered by the gminas of Hanna, Łomazy, Podedwórze, Tuczna, Wisznice and Wyryki.

References

External links
Polish official population figures 2006

Sosnowka
Biała Podlaska County